Ted Elliott (born July 4, 1961) is an American screenwriter and film producer. Along with his writing partner Terry Rossio, Elliott has written some of the most successful American films of the past 30 years, including Aladdin (1992), Shrek (2001) and the Pirates of the Caribbean series (2003-11).

He was attached to write a feature version of Monkey Island, which never happened.

In 2004, he was elected to the board of directors of the Writers Guild of America; his term on the board ended in 2006. In 2005, Elliott ran for president of the Writers Guild of America, west, but lost to animation writer and historical figurine maker Patric Verrone. Verrone received 1301 votes; Elliott received 591.

Filmography (partial listing)

Other credits

References 

 Ted Elliott Filmography and Biography, provided by Wordplayer.com

External links 
 
 Wordplayer.com
 The Disney Lawsuit

1961 births
Living people
American male screenwriters
Animation screenwriters
Annie Award winners
Best Adapted Screenplay BAFTA Award winners
DreamWorks Animation people
Walt Disney Animation Studios people